David Collier (born January 24, 1963) is a Canadian alternative cartoonist best known for his fact-based "comic strip essays."

Biography 
As a child, Collier was introduced to the work of Robert Crumb, whose work has been a significant influence. (Collier's cross-hatching style is particularly reminiscent of Crumb's work.) Before breaking into comics, Collier served in the Canadian Army from 1987 to 1990. He drew comic strips for the army newspapers the Cornwallis Ensign, CFB Chilliwack Mountaineer, and CFB Valcartier Adsum. His Army training also introduced him to long-distance running and the biathlon, in which he has competed nationally.

His first comic strip was published in 1986 in the R. Crumb-edited magazine Weirdo, and his work has been published in numerous other comics anthologies, including Duplex Planet Illustrated, Drawn & Quarterly, The Comics Journal, and Zero Zero. Most of the material from his anthology submissions was collected in Just the Facts: A Decade of Comic Essays.

Since 1990, Collier has done comics and illustrations for Canadian newspapers such as The Globe and Mail and the Saskatoon StarPhoenix. He has illustrated stories for Harvey Pekar's American Splendor, most notably the three-issue American Splendor: Unsung Hero.

Fantagraphics published four issues of the aptly titled series Collier's in the 1990s. Much of this material was reprinted in Portraits from Life. Drawn & Quarterly later published volume two of Collier's, lasting two issues.

Collier's Surviving Saskatoon documents the true story of David Milgaard, a man who spent over 20 years in prison after he was wrongfully accused of the brutal rape and murder of a nurse in 1969.

Collier featured in a 2013 episode of CBC Radio program Wiretap, describing his experiences rejoining the army at 41, also the subject of his book Chimo.

For the 2014–15 Alex Colville retrospective held at the Art Gallery of Ontario and National Gallery of Canada, Collier produced a commissioned work inspired by Colville that was displayed as an installation and also published in print under the title Colville Comics (2014).

Collier lives with his wife, Ontario artist Jennifer Hambleton, and son James (born in 1999), in Hamilton.

Awards 
Collier's The Frank Ritza Papers was nominated for a Doug Wright Award for Best Book in 2005.

Hamilton Illustrated was awarded the Pigskin Peters Award for 2013 at the Toronto Comic Arts Festival. The award recognizes the best in experimental or avant-garde comics.

Bibliography 
Comic books

Collections and graphic novels

References

External links 
 Lambiek Comiclopedia entry
 
 
 "Two-Handed Man Interviews David Collier" - 2002 interview
 2008 audio interview at Inkstuds
 "Pay Attention: David Collier’s Chimo" - essay by Jeet Heer
 2012 audio interview at Resonance FM
 "“Hopefully You Reach a Few People Here and There”: A David Collier Interview" - 2018 interview at The Comics Journal

Alternative cartoonists
Artists from Windsor, Ontario
Canadian Army soldiers
Living people
1963 births
Canadian cartoonists